College Baseball All-America teams are selected each year by various organizations and consist of players who compete in National Collegiate Athletic Association (NCAA), National Association of Intercollegiate Athletics (NAIA), and National Junior College Athletic Association (NJCAA) intercollegiate  baseball.  In general, an All-American team is an honorary sports team composed of the best amateur players of a specific season for each team position—who in turn are given the honorific "All-America" and typically referred to as "All-American athletes", or simply "All-Americans".  Although the honorees generally do not compete together as a unit, the term is used in U.S. team sports to refer to players who are selected by members of the national media or other organizations.

Currently, several organizations select their own individual, college baseball, All-America teams. The NCAA includes three selectors in its historical records: the American Baseball Coaches Association (ABCA), Collegiate Baseball, and Baseball America. According to its own website, the ABCA selected its first All-American baseball team in 1950.  It has since chosen All-American teams and a player of the year for each division (NCAA Division I, Division II, Division III, NAIA, NJCAA Divisions I, II, and III, and high school).  NCAA records, however, show ABCA teams since 1947.  Collegiate Baseball selects college All-American, college Freshman All-American, and High School All-American teams, and a college player of the year. Its selections go back to 1991.  Baseball America selects pre-season and post-season All-American teams and a College Player of the Year. Its selections go back to 1981. The National Collegiate Baseball Writers Association (NCBWA) has selected All-American teams since 2001.

Consensus "All-Americans"
For the names of consensus All-Americans, see footnote

After the Collegiate Baseball Newspaper became – in 1991 – the third organization to begin selecting its own All-American teams (joining the ABCA and Baseball America), the concept arose of "consensus" All-American teams. From 1991 to 2000, a player is considered by some people to be a "consensus All-American" if he is named to an All-American team by two of the three organizations. In 2001, the NCBWA became the fourth organization to start naming its own teams. Therefore, since 2001, a player is considered by some people to be a consensus All-American if he is selected as an All-American by three of the four organizations.

See also

References

 
Awards established in 1947